Mohammad Jihad al-Laham (born 13 January 1954) is a Syrian politician who has been the Speaker of the People's Council of Syria from 2012 to 2016. A prominent criminal lawyer, al-Laham heads the Damascus office of the Syrian Lawyers Syndicate.

On 7 May 2012, al-Laham was elected as a representative of Damascus. On 24 May 2012, al-Laham was elected as Speaker of Parliament. He received 225 votes out of 250. His selection was one of the first acts of the new Parliament of Syria. He is a member of the Ba'ath Party of Syria. Upon his election as Speaker, al-Laham stated that "Syria is passing through a stage that requires every individual to exert his efforts" and that "the Assembly should be a mirror that reflects the reality of all Syrians and meet their aspirations."

References

Speakers of the People's Assembly of Syria
Living people
Members of the Regional Command of the Arab Socialist Ba'ath Party – Syria Region
1954 births
Syrian Sunni Muslims